Ukiah School is a public K–12 school in Ukiah, Oregon, United States.

Academics
In 2008, 100% of the school's seniors received a high school diploma. Of 14 students, 14 graduated and none dropped out.

Exchange students
Ukiah school has a long history of receiving exchange students from countries all over the world, including the Netherlands, Germany and China.

References

High schools in Umatilla County, Oregon
Public middle schools in Oregon
Public high schools in Oregon
Public elementary schools in Oregon
1926 establishments in Oregon